Raphael "Raphi" Rom is an Israeli computer scientist working at Technion – Israel Institute of Technology.

Rom earned his Ph.D. in 1975 from the University of Utah, under the supervision of Thomas Stockham. He is known for his contribution to the development of the Catmull–Rom spline, and for his research on computer networks.

Selected publications
.
.
.
.
.
.

References

External links
Home page

Living people
Academic staff of Technion – Israel Institute of Technology
Computer scientists
University of Utah alumni
Year of birth missing (living people)